The Chair of the National Endowment for the Humanities (NEH) is the executive leader of the National Endowment for the Humanities, an independent federal agency created in 1965. The Chair directs the NEH and is the sole position in the agency with the legal authority to make grants and awards. The NEH Chair is appointed by the president and confirmed by the Senate. The National Council on the Humanities, a board of 26 private citizens who are also appointed by the President and confirmed by the Senate, advises the Chair.

List of Chairpersons
 Barnaby Keeney, 1963–1965, Chair of National Commission on the Humanities
 Henry Allen Moe, 1965–66, Interim Chair
 Barnaby Keeney, 1966–1970
 Wallace Edgerton, Acting Chair, 1970–71
 Ronald Berman, 1971–1977
 Robert Kingston, Acting Chair, 1977
 Joseph Duffey, 1977–81
 William J. Bennett, 1981–85
 John Agresto, Acting Chair, 1985
 Lynne Cheney, 1986–1993
 Jerry L. Martin, Acting Chair, 1993
 Donald Gibson, Acting Chair, 1993
 Sheldon Hackney, 1993–97
 Bruce A. Lehman, Acting Chair, 1997
 William R. Ferris, 1997–2001
 Bruce Cole, 2001–2009
 Carole M. Watson, Acting Chair, 2009
 Jim Leach, 2009–2013
 Carole M. Watson, Acting Chair, 2013–2014
 William 'Bro' Adams, 2014–2017
 Margaret "Peggy" Plympton, Acting Chair, 2017–2018
 Jon Parrish Peede, 2018–2021 
 Adam Wolfson, Acting Chair, 2021–2022
 Shelly Lowe, 2022–Present

References